Qurdarik-e Olya (also Romanized as Qūrdarīk-e ‘Olyā; also known as Qūrdīk-e Bālā and Qūrdīk-e ‘Olyā) is a village in Sokmanabad Rural District, Safayyeh District, Khoy County, West Azerbaijan Province, Iran. At the 2006 census, its population was 622, in 132 families.

References 

Populated places in Khoy County